Platypalpus trivialis is a species of hybotid dance flies (insects in the family Hybotidae).

References

Hybotidae
Articles created by Qbugbot
Insects described in 1864